St. Stepanos Monastery was an Armenian monastery located near Tivi village (Ordubad district) of the Nakhchivan Autonomous Republic of Azerbaijan. The monastery was located some 2 km south of Tivi village, on high ground in the abandoned village of Navush.

History 
The monastery was founded in the 11–12th centuries, its apse contains 15th century cross-stones (khachkars). An Armenian inscription on the tympanum attests that the church was renovated in 1677.

Architecture 
In Armenian manuscripts, St. Stepanos is referred as both a hermitage and a monastery. One of the first mentions of St. Stepanos is in a colophon of a gospel that was copied in 1489 and restored in the monastery. The monastery was a basilica with gabled roof and had a nave and two aisles. In the apse and two vestries were secret chambers.

Destruction 
The monastery was razed to ground at some point between 1997 and June 15, 2006, as documented by investigation of the Caucasus Heritage Watch.

References 

Armenian churches in Azerbaijan
Ruins in Azerbaijan